The 2022–23 Toledo Rockets men's basketball team represented the University of Toledo during the 2022–23 NCAA Division I men's basketball season. The Rockets, led by 13th-year head coach Tod Kowalczyk, played their home games at Savage Arena, as members of the Mid-American Conference.  They won their third straight regular season championship with a 16-2 record in MAC Play.  They defeated Miami and Ohio in the first two rounds of the MAC tournament before losing to Kent State in the final. As a regular season champion who did not win their conference tournament, they received an automatic bid to the National Invitation Tournament, where they lost to Michigan in the first round.

Previous season

The Rockets finished the 2021–22 season 26-8, 17-3 in MAC Play to finish as regular season champions. They defeated Central Michigan in the quarterfinals of the MAC tournament before losing in the semifinals to Kent State.  As a No. 1 seed who failed to win their conference tournament, they received an automatic bid to the National Invitation Tournament where they lost in the first round to Dayton.

Offseason

Departures

Incoming transfers

Recruiting class

Roster

Schedule and results

|-
!colspan=9 style=|Exhibition

|-

|-

!colspan=9 style=|Non-conference regular season

|-
!colspan=9 style=| MAC regular season

|-
!colspan=9 style=| MAC tournament

|-
!colspan=9 style=| <span
style=
>NIT</span> 

Source

References

Toledo
Toledo Rockets men's basketball seasons
Toledo Rockets men's basketball
Toledo Rockets men's basketball
Toledo